The Roman Catholic Diocese of Atakpamé is a diocese located in the city of Atakpamé in the Ecclesiastical province of Lomé in Togo.

History
29 September 1964: Established as Diocese of Atakpamé from the Metropolitan Archdiocese of Lomé

Bishops
Bishops of Atakpamé (Roman rite)
Bishop Bernard Oguki-Atakpah (29 September 1964 – 1976)
Bishop Philippe Fanoko Kossi Kpodzro (10 April 1976 – 17 December 1992), appointed Archbishop of Lomé
Bishop Julien Mawule Kouto (18 October 1993 – 1 March 2006)
Bishop Nicodème Anani Barrigah-Benissan (9 January 2008 - 23 November 2019), appointed Archbishop of Lomé 
Bishop Moise Touho (26 October 2022 -)

Other priest of this diocese who became bishop
Célestin-Marie Gaoua, appointed Bishop of Sokodé in 2016

See also
Roman Catholicism in Togo

References
GCatholic.org
Catholic Hierarchy

Atakpame
Atakpame
Roman Catholic dioceses and prelatures established in the 20th century
Christian organizations established in 1964

Sources
 Catholic Hierarchy Information